Ragnar Skanåker (born 8 June 1934) is a Swedish competitive pistol shooter who was a world-class shooter for an extremely long period. His international breakthrough came in the 1972 Olympics, where he won the 50 m Pistol event. He is mostly associated with this event, the only one in which he has won Olympic medals (four medals distributed over his participation in seven Olympic games, plus the 1982 World Championship), but he also won the 1983 World Championship in 10 m Air Pistol and, surprisingly to most, the 1978 World Championship in 25 m Standard Pistol, with a new world record (that is still  a European record). Skanåker's Swedish record in 50 m Pistol is 583, later a world record qualification in 2014 (Jin Jong-Oh, Korea).

He has participated in Olympic games in 1972, 1976, 1980, 1984, 1988, 1992 and 1996. He would have participated in Athens 2004 thanks to a special invitation from the International Olympic Committee, but the Swedish Olympic Committee decided not to let Skanåker participate due to insufficient results during the year. An upset Skanåker reported that he would be aiming to participate in 2008 instead, the year he turned 74.

Over the years, Skanåker has worked as a shooting coach in several countries, and designed shooting-specific equipment, sometimes in cooperation with famous weapon manufacturers such as Cesare Morini. Today, he still competes although less often at the international level. He also engages in various debates in Sweden. He also promotes the precision glasses he has designed.

Olympic results

See also
List of athletes with the most appearances at Olympic Games

References

External links
 Official website
 Skanåker's profile at ISSF NEWS
  SOK stoppar Skanåker from  SVT.se

1934 births
Living people
Swedish male sport shooters
Olympic shooters of Sweden
ISSF pistol shooters
Shooters at the 1972 Summer Olympics
Shooters at the 1976 Summer Olympics
Shooters at the 1980 Summer Olympics
Shooters at the 1984 Summer Olympics
Shooters at the 1988 Summer Olympics
Shooters at the 1992 Summer Olympics
Shooters at the 1996 Summer Olympics
Olympic gold medalists for Sweden
Olympic silver medalists for Sweden
Olympic bronze medalists for Sweden
Olympic medalists in shooting
Medalists at the 1972 Summer Olympics
Medalists at the 1984 Summer Olympics
Medalists at the 1988 Summer Olympics
Medalists at the 1992 Summer Olympics
People from Ängelholm Municipality
Sportspeople from Skåne County
20th-century Swedish people
21st-century Swedish people